The 1891–92 Ottawa Hockey Club season was the club's seventh season of play. The Club would play in the Amateur Hockey Association of Canada, the Ontario Hockey Association (OHA) and inter-city play. Ottawa would win their second straight OHA championship. Ottawa would also win the AHAC championship on January 10, and hold it until March 7.

AHAC series

Play in the AHAC was by challenge. Ottawa won on January 10 to become champions. In all, Ottawa would win six challenges, but lose the final one to lose the AHAC championship.

OHA series

To reach the final, Ottawa had to defeat Queen's University.

Rosters

Referee: E. Littlejohn, Umpires: V. Chadwick and C. A. Bogert
Attendance: 2,500

Source:

Celebration dinner
The Ottawa Hockey Club was feted at a party by the Ottawa Amateur Athletic Association at Ottawa's Russell House hotel on March 18, 1892. The dinner is notable as Lord Stanley, the Governor-General would announce his new trophy, the "Dominion Hockey Challenge Cup", today known as the Stanley Cup. Lord Kilcoursie, Stanley's aide made the announcement:

"I have for some time been thinking that it would be a good thing if there were a challenge cup which would be held by the champion hockey team in the Dominion. There does not appear to be any such outward and visible sign of a championship at present, and considering the general interest which the matches now elicit, and in the importance of having the games played fairly and under rules generally recognized, I am willing to give a cup, which shall be held from year to year by the winning team.

I am not quite certain that the present regulations governing the arrangement of matches give entire satisfaction, and it would be worth considering whether they could not be arranged so that each team would play once at home and once at the play where their opponents hail from."

According to Shea and Wilson, the second paragraph is a reference to the disappointment in the AHAC series. Ottawa had held the championship for most of the season, only to lose in the end. The AHAC would change its method of play from challenge to round-robin in the 1893 season.

Lord Kilcoursie composed a song for the occasion:

THE HOCKEY MEN

There is a game called hockeyThere is no finer gameFor though some call it ''Yet we love it all the same.

This played in His DominionWell played both near and farThere's only one opinionHow 'tis played in Ottawa.

Then give three cheers for RussellThe captain of the boys.However tough the tussleHis position he enjoys.

And then for all the othersLet's shout as loud we mayAn O, a T, a T, an AA W and A!

Now list' to me one minuteI'll tell you where they playAnd why it is that eagerlyWe welcome them today

They vanquished in their revelQuebec and MontrealThe gallant club, the Rebelsand the Queen's and Osgoode Hall

Well, first there's Chauncy KirbyHe's worth his weight in goldFor though he is not very bigHe's very very bold.

Supported by his brotherThey make a wondrous pairFor either one or t'otherIs invariably there.

And on the left, there's BradleyAnd on the right, there's KerrAnd when the centres pass itThere, on either side, they are.

And that's what won the battlesTheir fine unselfish playCool heads that nothing rattlesIn the thickest of the fray.

At cover point – important placeThere's Young, a bulwark strong.No dodging tricks or flying paceWill baffle him for long.

At point, we have the captainAnd if he gets the puckWill very near the goal he'll shootAnd get it too, with luck.

There's yet another memberImpregnable Morel.He's had his share of work to doAnd done it very well.

And there is also JenkinsWho played in matches twainSo well that in TorontoThey don't wish for him again.

And now, my friends, forgive meThe moral of my songI'll soon explain in twenty wordsNor keep you very long.

We've here eight bright examplesOf fine unselfish playAnd that's the secret of successAnd why they're here today.

Just one word to the audienceAnd every player too(Forgive me, though a novice,In dictating this to you).

Don't question a decisionHowever wrong it be.And little boys, for manner's sake,Don't hoot the referee!

Stanley Cup monument
In October 2017, the "Lord Stanley's Gift Monument" to the donation of the Stanley Cup was erected in Ottawa at Sparks Street and Elgin Street, near the location of the Russell House hotel, which has since been demolished.

Roster
 Reginald Bradley, William Dey, Frank Jenkins, Jack Kerr, E.C. Grant, Chauncey Kirby, Halder Kirby, Albert Morel, Bert Russel, Weldy Young

See also
 1892 AHAC season
 Amateur Hockey Association of Canada
 Ice hockey in Ottawa
 Rideau Hall Rebels
 Stanley Cup

References

Bibliography

Notes

Ottawa Senators (original) seasons
Ottawa